Trithemis brydeni is a species of dragonfly in the family Libellulidae. It is found in Botswana and Zambia. Its natural habitats are rivers and freshwater marshes.

References

brydeni
Taxonomy articles created by Polbot
Insects described in 1970